Still Waiting...  is a 2009 American independent black comedy film directed by Jeff Balis and starring John Michael Higgins and Robert Patrick Benedict. It is the sequel to Waiting... (2005). Some of the cast of the original film appear in the sequel. Adam Carolla and Justin Long appear in cameo roles. It was written by Rob McKittrick, who wrote and directed the original film.

Plot
On the last night of the fiscal quarter, Dennis, manager of Shenaniganz, will be promoted to district manager if the restaurant sells $9,000 worth of food or more. To motivate the crew, Dennis tells them that the restaurant will close if they do not meet this goal. Their biggest competition is next door: Ta-Ta's, a bar with scantily clad waitresses, managed by the self-confident Calvin. At Ta-Ta's, it is Allison's first day; she is nervous. At Shenanigan's, Mason, a cook, is trying his best to be cool, without success. As the shift wears on, each employee faces his worst fears, and Dennis tries to learn how to attract women. Next door, Calvin and Allison make self-discoveries.

Cast

Release
The film was released directly to DVD. Justin Long, who starred in the first film, would later say that he was "truly embarrassed" to be involved with Still Waiting... (via his cameo) in an interview with Peter Travers of Rolling Stone. "It's offensive. I think it's offensive."

Reception
Rotten Tomatoes has two critical reviews, both negative.

References

External links
 
 

2009 comedy films
2009 films
2009 direct-to-video films
2009 independent films
2000s English-language films
American comedy films
American direct-to-video films
American independent films
American sequel films
Direct-to-video comedy films
Direct-to-video sequel films
Films set in restaurants
Lionsgate films
2000s American films